is a town located in Fuwa District, Gifu Prefecture, Japan. , the town had an estimated population of 7,109 and a population density of 140 persons per km2, in 2,725 households.

The town is most famous for the Battle of Sekigahara which ended the Sengoku Period and created the Tokugawa Shogunate. Due to this, Sekigahara is also a sister city of Waterloo, Belgium and Gettysburg, Pennsylvania, sites of other famous and significant battles on their continents.

Geography
Sekigahara is located in a mountainous valley in far southwestern Gifu Prefecture, which forms a natural bottleneck connecting the Kansai region with the Tōkai region of Japan. The routes of the ancient Nakasendō highway  and the modern Meishin Expressway, as well as the Tōkaidō Shinkansen and Tōkaidō Main Line all pass through this area.

Climate

The town has a climate characterized by hot and humid summers, and mild winters  (Köppen climate classification Cfa). The mountainous areas of the town are noted for heavy snow in winter.

Neighbouring municipalities
Gifu Prefecture
Ōgaki
Tarui
Ibigawa
Shiga Prefecture
Maibara

Demographics
Per Japanese census data, the population of Sekigahara has declined over the past 50 years.

History
The area around Sekigahara was part of traditional Mino Province.  In 1600, the Battle of Sekigahara took place here. During the Edo period it was tenryō territory directly under the Tokugawa shogunate, administered by a hatamoto. During the post-Meiji restoration cadastral reforms, the area was organised into Fuwa District, Gifu Prefecture. The village of Sekigahara was formed on July 1, 1889 with the establishment of the modern municipalities system, and was raised to town status on April 1, 1928. In 1954, Sekigahara annexed the village of Imasu, as well as part of the neighboring town of Tarui. A proposed merger with the neighboring city of Ōgaki was rejected in 2004.

Education
Sekigahara has one public elementary school and one public middle school operated by the town government, and one private combined elementary/middle school. The town does not have a high school.

Transportation

Railway
 JR Central - Tōkaidō Main Line

Highway
  Meishin Expressway

Sister city relations
 - Gettysburg, Pennsylvania, USA, from 2016 
 - Waterloo, Belgium, from 2017

Local attractions
site of the Battle of Sekigahara

Notes

External links

 Sekigahara Town 
 Gifu Prefectural homepage

 
Towns in Gifu Prefecture